The Official Secrets Act 1989 (c. 6) is an Act of the Parliament of the United Kingdom that repeals and replaces section 2 of the Official Secrets Act 1911, thereby removing the public interest defence created by that section.

Lord Bingham said that the white paper "Reform of Section 2 of the Official Secrets Act 1911" (Cm. 408) (June 1988) was the immediate precursor of this Act and that its recommendations bear directly on the interpretation of this Act.

General information

Capacity
The offences under sections 1(3), 2(1), 3(1) and 4(1) can be committed only by persons who are or have been, and the offence under section 8(1) can be committed only by persons who are, Crown servants or government contractors.

The offences under the Act, that can be committed only by persons who, as the case may be, are or have been Crown servants, government contractors, or members of the security and intelligence services, can be committed only where the information, document or other article in question is or has been in the possession of the person in question by virtue of their position as such.

The offences under sections 5(2), 5(6), 6(2), 8(4), 8(5) and 8(6) can be committed by any person.

Requirement that the disclosure be "damaging"
Sections 1(3), 2(1), 3(1), 5(3)(a) and 6(2) provide that the disclosures to which they apply are not an offence unless they are "damaging". Section 4(2) is similar.

Extraterritorial jurisdiction
Offences under any provision of the Act, other than sections 8(1) or 8(4) or 8(5), committed by any person in the United Kingdom, the Isle of Man, the Channel Islands, or in any colony, or committed by British citizens or Crown servants in any place, are cognisable as offences under the law of the United Kingdom.

Arrest and mode of trial
In England and Wales, offences under any provision of this Act other than sections 8(1) or 8(4) or 8(5) were formerly classified as arrestable offences, initially by virtue of sections 24(1)(c) and (2)(bb) of the Police and Criminal Evidence Act 1984, and then by virtue of sections 24(1)(c) and (2) of, and paragraph 18 of Schedule 1A to, that Act.

The offences under sections 8(1), (4) and (5) are triable only summarily; the others are triable either way.

Prescribed bodies and persons
Sections 7(5), 8(9), 12 and 13(1) confer powers on the Secretary of State to "prescribe" bodies and persons for certain purposes. These powers have been exercised by the following instruments:
 The Official Secrets Act 1989 (Prescription) Order 1990 (S.I. 1990/200)
 The Official Secrets Act 1989 (Prescription) (Amendment) Order 1993 (S.I. 1993/847)
 The Official Secrets Act 1989 (Prescription) (Amendment) Order 2003 (S.I. 2003/1918)
 The Official Secrets Act 1989 (Prescription) (Amendment) Order 2007 (S.I. 2007/2148)

Proposed revisions
The Intelligence and Security Committee (ISC) annual report for 2005–2006 on UK intelligence services states:

Specific provisions of this Act

Section 1 - Security and intelligence
Section 1(1) creates an offence of disclosing information, documents or other articles relating to security or intelligence.

It can be committed by any person who is or has been a member of the security and intelligence services, or who is or has been a person notified that he is subject to the provisions of section 1(1).

Cases under this section:
 R v. Shayler [2002] UKHL 11, [2002] All ER 477 (21 March 2002)
 R v. Shayler [2001] EWCA Crim 1977, [2001] WLR 2206 (28 September 2001)

Section 2 - Defence
Section 2(1) creates an offence of disclosing information, documents or other articles relating to defence. This section applies only to Crown servants and government contractors.

Section 3 - International relations
Section 3(1)(a) creates an offence of disclosing information, documents or other articles relating to international relations. This includes confidential information, documents or other article from a State other than the United Kingdom or an international organisation.  This section applies only to crown servants and government contractors.

Section 4 - Crime and special investigation powers
This section relates to disclosure of information which would assist a criminal or the commission of a crime.  This section applies only to crown servants and government contractors.

Section 5 - Information resulting from unauthorised disclosures or entrusted in confidence
This section relates to further disclosure of information, documents or other articles protected from disclosure by the preceding sections of the Act.  It allows, for example, the prosecution of newspapers or journalists who publish secret information leaked to them by a crown servant in contravention of section 3.  This section applies to everyone.

Section 6 - Information entrusted in confidence to other States or to international organisations

Section 6 creates an offence of making a "damaging disclosure" which "relates to security or intelligence, defence or international relations" where that information was provided in confidence "by or on behalf of the United Kingdom to another State or to an international organisation" where that person obtained it without that State or organization's authorization, and where no other offence under the earlier sections of this Act applies. Lawful authority and prior authorized disclosure are defences against this offence.

Section 7 - Authorised disclosures
Sections 7(1) to (3) provide that a disclosure is made with lawful authority if, and only if, the conditions specified therein are satisfied.

Section 7(4) provides a defence.

Sections 7(5) and (6) define the expressions "official authorisation" and "official restriction".

Section 8 - Safeguarding of information
This section makes it a crime for a crown servant or government contractor to retain information beyond their official need for it, and obliges them to properly protect secret information from accidental disclosure.

Section 9 - Restriction on prosecutions
Section 9(2) provides that no prosecution for an offence, in respect of any such information, document or other article as is mentioned in section 4(2), may be instituted, in England and Wales, except by or with the consent of the Director of Public Prosecutions, or in Northern Ireland, except by or with the consent of the Director of Public Prosecutions for Northern Ireland.

Section 9(1) provides that no prosecution for any other offence under this Act may be instituted, in England and Wales, except by or with the consent of the Attorney General, or in Northern Ireland, except by or with the consent of the Advocate General for Northern Ireland.

The words "Advocate General for Northern Ireland", in section 9(1), were substituted for the words "Attorney General for Northern Ireland" by sections 28 and 87 of, and paragraph 32 of Schedule 7 to, the Justice (Northern Ireland) Act 2002, on 12 April 2010.

Section 10 - Penalties
This section provides the penalties and mode of trial for offences under the Act.

Section 10(2) provides that a person guilty of an offence under section 8(1) or 8(4) or 8(5) is liable on summary conviction to imprisonment for a term not exceeding three months, or to a fine not exceeding level 5 on the standard scale, or to both.

Section 10(1) provides that a person guilty of any other offence under the Act is liable, on conviction on indictment to imprisonment for a term not exceeding two years, or to a fine, or to both, or, on summary conviction, to imprisonment for a term not exceeding six months, or to a fine not exceeding the statutory maximum, or to both.

The words "51 weeks" are prospectively substituted for the words "three months" in section 10(2) by paragraph 39 of Schedule 26 to the Criminal Justice Act 2003.

Section 11 - Arrest, search and trial

Section 11(1)
Section 11(1) inserted section 24(2)(bb) into the Police and Criminal Evidence Act 1984. It also omitted the reference to the Official Secrets Act 1911 in section 24(2)(b) of that Act.

It was repealed on 1 October 2002.

The repeal was consequential on the replacement of section 24(2) of the Police and Criminal Evidence Act 1984 with a new Schedule 1A to that Act.

Section 11(3)
Section 11(3) extends section 9(1) of the Official Secrets Act 1911 (which relates to search warrants).

Section 12 - Definition of Crown servant and government contractor
Section 12(1) defines the expression "Crown servant" for the purposes of this Act.

Sections 12(2) and (3) define the expression "government contractor" for the purposes of this Act.

Section 13 - Other interpretation provisions
This section defines the words and expressions "disclose", "disclosure", "international organisation", "prescribed" and "State" for the purposes of the Act.

Section 14
This section provides the procedure for making orders under the Act.

Section 15 - Acts done abroad and extent
Section 15(1)(a) provides that any act done by a British citizen or Crown servant, which would be an offence under any provision of the Act other than sections 8(1) or 8(4) or 8(5) if done by him in the United Kingdom, is an offence under that provision.

This is intended to cover espionage (where someone travels to a foreign country and discloses secret information to a foreign power) and cases where someone travels to a foreign country and discloses secret information, perhaps to a newspaper.

Section 15(1)(b) provides that any act done by any person in any of the Channel Islands, or in the Isle of Man, or in any colony, which would be an offence under any provision of the Act other than sections 8(1) or 8(4) or 8(5) if done by him in the United Kingdom, is an offence under that provision.

Section 15(3) confers a power on The King to extend, by Order in Council, any provision of the Act, subject to any exceptions, adaptations or modifications specified in the Order, to any of the Channel Islands, or to the Isle of Man, or to any colony.

This power was exercised by the Official Secrets Act 1989 (Hong Kong) Order 1992 (S.I. 1992/1301).

Section 16 - Citation, commencement, amendments, repeals and revocation
Section 16(1) authorises the citation of this Act by a short title.

Section 16(2) authorises the citation of this Act and the Official Secrets Acts 1911 to 1939 by a collective title.

Section 16(5) provides that the repeals of parts of the Official Secrets Act 1911 and the Official Secrets Act 1920 in Schedule 2 do not extend to any of the territories mentioned in section 15(3), subject to any Order made under section 15(3). The said territories mentioned in section 15(3) are the Channel Islands, the Isle of Man and all colonies. Such an Order was made in relation to Hong Kong (see above).

This section also provides for consequential amendments, repeals, a revocation, and commencement.

See also
 Official Secrets Act
 Richard Tomlinson, former MI6 agent imprisoned in 1997 for breaking the 1989 Act, by attempting to publish a book detailing his career.
 Katharine Gun, former GCHQ translator arrested under the Act whose case was later dropped by the government.
 O'Connor - Keogh official secrets trial
 Al Jazeera bombing memo
 Espionage Act of 1917 (US law)
 Clive Ponting, a public servant whose acquittal under the Official Secrets Act 1911 and subsequent book is said to have led to tightening of the law

References
 Halsbury's Statutes,
 John Griffin, "The Official Secrets Act 1989" (1989) 16 Journal of Law and Society 273

External links
 The Official Secrets Act 1989, as amended, from the National Archives.
 The Official Secrets Act 1989, as originally enacted, from the National Archives.
 A Basic Guide To The Official Secrets Act 1989

United Kingdom Acts of Parliament 1989
Classified information in the United Kingdom